Transportadora de Gas del Sur (Gas Transporter of the South) is the largest natural gas extractor in Argentina. The company was established in 1992, after the privatization of Gas del Estado, the state owned company that maintained the pipelines.

History 
Transportadora de Gas del Sur was established on December 28, 1992 after the privatization of the Argentine energy sector, it was part of Gas del Estado, a government regulated company divided later on Transportadora de Gas del Sur and Transportadora de Gas del Norte.

Operations

TGS is the largest gas supplier in Argentina, operating the biggest pipeline system of the country and of Latin America transporting the 60% of the total Natural gas consumed and supplies directly to distributors, electric generators and industries. 
TGS also distributes Liquefied natural gas (LNG), Operating in the General Cerri complex in Buenos Aires Province.

General Cerri Complex
Located in Buenos Aires Province the General Cerri Complex is dedicated to the recovery of ethane, propane, butane, natural gasoline, and NGL.
All the products recovered are dispatched to Galván Harbor, a nearby facility where they are stored or loaded in trucks or ships for distribution.
The General Cerri complex produces 40% of the company's income.

Pipelines

TGS has three pipelines that produce 60% of the company's income:

The Neuba I runs from Sierra Barrosa to Bahía Blanca. Originally built in 1970, it was expanded in 1996.  One of the main supply lines of the company, the pipeline transports the gas supply from the basin in central Neuquén across Rio Negro, La Pampa and Buenos Aires provinces, ending in the General Cherri Complex. The gas is later transported to the Greater Buenos Aires area.

The Neuba II, built in 1988, was expanded four times between 1996 and 2000. The pipeline begins in Cerros Colorados Complex, in the Neueuqén basin. It crosses Neuquén, Río Negro, La Pampa and Buenos Aires, ending in Ezeiza, Buenos Aires, just outside Buenos Aires. The pipeline is the main distribution for Buenos Aires and Greater Buenos Aires as well.

The San Martin is the largest of the three that provide natural gas to the Tierra del Fuego Province, Chubut province, Rio Negro, Neuquén, and Buenos Aires provinces.

References

Bibliography

External links

 
 TGS at Google Finance
 TGS at New York Times business news.

Oil and gas companies of Argentina
Natural gas pipeline companies
Energy companies established in 1992
Non-renewable resource companies established in 1992
1992 establishments in Argentina
Companies listed on the New York Stock Exchange
Companies listed on the Buenos Aires Stock Exchange